The Makmal is a river in Ak-Talaa District of Naryn Region and Toguz-Toro District of Jalal-Abad Region of Kyrgyzstan. It is a left tributary of the Ala-Buga.

References

Rivers of Kyrgyzstan